Yanpar (also known as Gökkuşağı) is a village in Akdeniz district of Mersin Province, Turkey. It is situated just south of Çukurova motorway. The name of the village refers to the Yanpar tribe. Although there are no references to this tribe in historical records, according to the village website, Yanpar is the original name of  the Yaparlu tribe of the historical records. Yanpar tribe is a Turkmen tribe that migrated from Central Anatolia to the present area during the short Egyptian rule in the 1830s. The population of the village was 730 as of 2012.

References

Villages in Akdeniz District